Kurume Arena is an arena in Kurume, Fukuoka, Japan.

Facilities
Main arena 2,560m2
Sub arena 782m2
Training room
Tatami Budojo
Floor Budojo
Archery field

References

Basketball venues in Japan
Indoor arenas in Japan
Rizing Zephyr Fukuoka
Sports venues in Fukuoka Prefecture
Kurume
Sports venues completed in 2018
2018 establishments in Japan